Sen. Binos Dauda Yaroe is the senator representing Adamawa South Senatorial District of Adamawa State at the Nigerian 9th National Assembly.

Early life 
Binos Dauda Yaroe was born on January 1, 1955, in Wagole, a village in Ribadu Ward of Mayo-Belwa Local Government Area of Adamawa State, Nigeria. He married Mrs. Gimbiya Joshua, in 1983; they have four children.

Education 
Binos Yaroe started his education at L.E.A. primary school Mayo-Belwa, 1962-1969; he then proceeded to Government College Kaduna in 1970 for his Secondary School education, passing out in June 1974 with Division One in the West African School Certificate Examination. Binos Yaroe was admitted into the School of Basic Studies of Ahmadu Bello University in July 1975 as a pioneer student of the one-year I.J.M.B. programme. In September 1975, Binos was absorbed into the Faculty of Administration, Kongo Campus, A.B.U. Zaria, for the B.Sc. Accounting degree programme. He graduated in June 1978 with Second Class Upper honours. On joining the NNPC in 1991, Binos Yaroe sat for the professional examinations of the Institute of Chartered Accountants of Nigeria (ICAN), passing the final qualifying examination in May 1992 and was admitted as an Associate Member of ICAN in February 1993. Upon joining the Nigerian Stock Exchange, Binos Yaroe enrolled for the MBA in Banking and Finance program of the University of Nigeria, Nsukka. The program was run on a weekend basis in collaboration with the Centre for Management Development, Shangisa Lagos from 1999 to 2002. And following his retirement from service, Binos Yaroe enrolled at the Bronnum Lutheran Seminary (BLS), Mbamba Yola, in October 2012, for the BA degree in Christian Religious Studies of the University of Jos, which he completed in April 2015 earning a Second-Class Upper Division honours.

Career 
Binos Yaroe began his career as a Lecturer in Accounting, at Anambra State College of Education Awka, where he was posted for the mandatory one-year National Youth Service Corps as his place of primary assignment from September 1978 to August 1979. After the NYSC, Binos worked with the Audit Firms of Deloitte Haskins and Sells and Unuigbe, Dangana and Co., in Kano, between August 1979 and July 1980. In August 1980 he joined the service of the College of Preliminary Studies (now Adamawa State Polytechnic) Yola, as an Accountant in the Bursary Department and a Chief Accountant and Head of the Bursary Department by 1987. In January 1988, the then Military Governor of Gongola State appointed Binos Yaroe as the Secretary of Zing Local Government following the December 1987 nationwide Local Government elections on non-partisan basis. He completed the national assignment in February 1989 and resumed his duties at the College of Preliminary Studies Yola as Head of the Bursary Department.

Binos Yaroe left the service of the College of Preliminary Studies Yola in March 1991 to join the Nigerian National Petroleum Corporation (NNPC) as an Assistant Chief Accountant. He was posted to the National Engineering and Technical Company Ltd (NETCO) in the Finance and Accounts Department. In the seven years he served NNPC/NETCO, Binos was the Deputy Chief Accountant and Chief Accountant. As part of his career development, the NNPC/NETCO sent Binos Yaroe on attachments to enable him acquire international exposure. In October 1992, he worked for four weeks with the Finance Unit of the OPEC Secretariat in Vienna, Austria. Then from January to March 1994 he was in the London office of Bechtel, receiving training on Jobsite General Accounting.

Binos Yaroe finally retired from public service in March 1998 as the Financial Controller of NETCO to join the Nigerian Stock Exchange as Deputy General Manager and Head of Quotations/Listings Department. Binos Yaroe helped the Quotations Department of the Exchange through the first decade of the 21st Century that saw the NSE and the Nigerian Capital Market grow in leaps and bounds through privatization of government enterprises and the consolidation of banks and other financial institutions.

Between 1999 and 2008, Binos Yaroe represented The Nigerian Stock Exchange as a board member of the Nigerian Accounting Standards Board (NASB). he served as:

1. Member, Technical Committee on an Accounting Standard on Abridged Financial Statements, SAS No. 20,

2. Member, Technical Committee on an Accounting Standard on Earnings Per Share (SAS No. 21), and

3. Chairman, Technical Committee on an Accounting Standard on Interim Financial Reporting(SAS No. 25).

In 2007 Binos Yaroe was inaugurated by SEC as member of an 11-man Ad-hoc Committee on Auditing and Financial Reporting charged with the responsibility of harmonizing and upgrading financial reporting and auditing practices of quoted companies operating in Nigeria.

Binos Yaroe served as the member representing The Nigerian Stock Exchange on the Administrative Proceedings Committee of the Securities and Exchange Commission, 2009 to 2011. He also served as member representing The Nigerian Stock Exchange on the Governing Council of the Institute of Capital Market Registrars, 2009-2011.

As part of his career development, Binos Yaroe has attended courses and workshops in Oil & Gas Accounting and Investments & Securities Administration both in Nigeria and outside the country. Key courses and programs attended include:

1. Residential Course in Oil and Gas Accounting conducted by KPMG in collaboration with the Petroleum Development Institute of the University of North Texas, Warri, July–August 1992

2. International Oil and Gas Management Workshop, College of Petroleum and Energy Studies, Oxford UK, September–October 1992

3. Bechtel ci Leadership Certification, Lagos, September 1994

4. Euromoney Corporate Finance Course, Lagos, 1999

5. Euromoney Bond Program, Johannesburg, 2001

6. Euromoney Investment Banking Program, Lagos, 2001

7. International Institute for Securities Development, US Securities and Exchange Commission, Washington DC, April-May 2003

8. Securities Market Regulation and Enforcement, an African Regional Capital Market Training Program, Abuja, September 2005

9. Towards Effective Regulation and Development of an Effective Capital Market in Africa Training Program, SEC Ghana and US SEC, Accra, September 2009.

Sen. Binos Yaroe is a technocrat, belonging to many professional bodies. Some of the professional memberships include:

1. Fellow, Institute of Chartered Accountants of Nigeria (FCA)

2. Fellow, Chartered Institute of Taxation (FCTI)

3. Member, Nigerian Institute of Management (MNIM)

4. Associate, Institute of Directors (AIoD)

5. Associate, Institute of Capital Market Registrars ( ACMR)

6. Member, Institute of Petroleum, UK (MInstPet)

Sen. Binos Yaroe served for years as a member of the following Committees of the Institute of Chartered Accountants of Nigeria:

1. Students Affairs Committee (1998-2001)

2. Publications, Public Affairs and Image Committee (2002-2004)

3. Electoral Matters Committee (2010-2013)

Sen. Binos Yaroe retired from the Nigerian Stock Exchange in April 2011 as General Manager and Head of Listings Directorate/Deputy to the CEO of The Nigerian Stock Exchange and returned to his hometown, Mayo-Belwa, Adamawa State, to take up farming. He is a practicing farmer and proprietor of Impact Farms Ltd, located at Km 5, Mayo-Belwa-Jada Road, Mayo-Belwa Local Government Area of Adamawa State.

On completing his BA programme at the BLS, the Lutheran Church of Christ in Nigeria Sabon Gari "B" District, which endorsed his application to the Seminary, called him and he was ordained as a Pastor of the Lutheran Church of Christ in Nigeria at the annual convention of the Church in Demsa, Adamawa State, in February 2017. After his ordination, Binos Yaroe was posted to his home Diocese, Mayo-Belwa Diocese as the Assistant District Pastor of Sabon Gari "B" District. He was subsequently appointed by the Archbishop of LCCN as his Special Adviser on Finance and Economic Affairs, thus admitting him to the Executive Committee and General Church Council of LCCN as an ex-officio member.

Political career 
Binos Yaroe has always been politically active in Adamawa State. As far back as 2007 he has supported several aspirants in their contests for various political offices. In the final year of his studies at the BLS, Binos Yaroe was drafted into partisan politics to contest the Adamawa South Senatorial seat. He contested the 2015 general elections on the platform of the Peoples Democratic Movement (PDM), albeit without success. The Independent National Electoral Commission declared Abubakar Ahmed Mo’allahyiddi of the All Progressive Congress (APC) winner of March 28, 2015 senatorial election. He did not challenge the election.

In 2018, Binos Yaroe ran for the Senate to represent Adamawa South in the 2019 general elections. He sought nomination on the platform of the People's Democratic Party (PDP). On October 3, 2018, Binos Yaroe was elected as the senatorial candidate of the Peoples Democratic Party at primaries election which took place in Numan, defeating Senator Grace Folashade Bent and Mr. Kobis Ari Thimnu to fly the flag of PDP in the 2019 Adamawa South Senatorial District Election. On February 23, 2019, Yaroe was duly elected Senator to represent Adamawa South Senatorial District having polled 164,741 votes over the incumbent Senator Abubakar Ahmed Mo’allahyiddi of the All Progressives Congress, who polled 118,129 votes. Senator Mo'Allayidi challenged the election but the matter was dismissed by the tribunal. He appealed the decision at the Court of Appeal sitting in Yola and lost. [https://www.vanguardngr.com/2019/06/as-the-9th-national-assembly-is-inaugurated/ Mr. Binos Yaroe alongside his colleagues were inaugurated and sworn in as Senators of the Federal Republic of Nigeria on June 11, 2019.

Nigerian Senate 
Senator Binos Yaroe was appointed Vice Chairman of the Senate Committee on Capital Market. He was appointed into other Committees of the Senate including:

1. Anti-Corruption and Financial Crimes

2. Downstream Petroleum Resources

3. Employment, Labour and Productivity

4. Information and National Orientation

5. Interior

6. Legislative Compliance

7. Local Content

8. Primary Health Care and Communicable Diseases

9. Privatization

10. Solid Minerals, Mines Steel Development and Metallurgy

Sen. Binos Yaroe, helped to pass two bills initially sponsored by his predecessors, viz:

1. Bill for the establishment of the School of Mines and Geological Studies in Guyuk, Adamawa State.

2. Bill to establish Federal College of Forestry in Toungo, Adamawa State.

Both bills have scaled through the first and second reading on the floor of the senate. Sen. Binos Yaroe also sponsored a motion compelling The National Emergency Management Agency (NEMA) to immediately implement a response programme for the flood disaster that affected various communities in Demsa, Numan, Guyuk and Lamurde Local Governments of Adamawa

Senator Binos helped in free medical outreach in Demsa where about 10,000 people benefited. On January 17, 2020, another free medical outreach was sponsored by him in Ganye local Government where about 5,000 benefited from the gesture Successful surgical operations were done to people suffering from hernia, tumor, growth, eyes and appendicitis, including a 60 year old man who suffered from a hernia for 12 years.

Sen. Binos has also helped the re-piping of water pipes in ward 2 Numan Local Government, which has been a tremendous help to the residents, who until now suffered from lack of potable water.

Sen. Binos Yaroe has also initiated and allowed the training of50 Youths from Adamawa South Senatorial District on entrepreneurship and leadership development

On April 9, 2020 Sen. Yaroe distributed about 18,000 bags of grains as palliative to cushion the effect of the coronavirus pandemic ravaging the country and whole world

He has also moved a motion on the need to stop the incessant attacks in Adamawa South. He said Most of the local governments in his Senatorial district have been attacked severally including looting, burning, wanton killing of men and women. He visited the Affected communities and transverse all the affected areas and reassure the people that he will in his capacity ensure that the federal government finds a lasting solution to the perennial attacks. Sen. Binos donated over 100 bags of rice and financial support to ameliorate the sufferings of the victims.

As part of his 2019 constituency projects, he has sponsored (3) and donated (2) solar powered boreholes at Wuro Abbo in Jada LGA, in Demsa LGA, and green village in numan local government area.

Sen. Binos Yaroe has visited many countries including United States of America, Canada, United Kingdom, Austria, Sweden, France, Spain, Israel, Turkey, Malaysia, South Africa, Egypt, Zambia, Cote d’Ivoire, Ghana, Sierra Leone, Gambia, Benin and Niger.

References 

Living people
Nigerian politicians
1955 births